Lamprosema nigricostalis is a species of moth of the family Crambidae described by George Hampson in 1908. It is found in India.

References 

Lamprosema
Moths described in 1908
Moths of Asia